Hermaeophaga is a genus of beetles belonging to the family Chrysomelidae. There are some 60 described species, from the Palaearctic, Oriental, and Afrotropical regions.

Selected species
 Hermaeophaga acuminata
 Hermaeophaga adamsi Balý, 1874
 Hermaeophaga aemula Bechyné, 1948
 Hermaeophaga mercurialis

References

Alticini
Chrysomelidae genera